Connor Taylor is the name of:

Connor Taylor (footballer, born 1992), English footballer
Connor Taylor (footballer, born 2001), English footballer for Stoke City and Bristol Rovers